The Nantes tram-train is a tram-train network operating in the French city of Nantes and the surrounding region.

Background
The Nantes to Châteaubriant railway line was part of a former Nantes to Rennes railway route which originally opened in 1877. The Nantes to Châteaubriant section closed to passenger traffic in 1980 and to freight in 2008. Approval to modernise this line received approval in 2009; and in 2014, the line reopened for exclusive use of the Nantes tram-train network, becoming the second line to operate after an existing line to Clisson opened in 2011, sharing track with mainline trains.

See also 

 Nantes tramway
 Tram-train de l'ouest lyonnais

References

Tram transport in France